Tourouvre is a French commune, located in the department of Orne in Basse-Normandie region.

Tourouvre may also refer to:

Canada 
 Lake Tourouvre, lake created by the Dam Trenche on the River Trenche, La Tuque, Quebec